The Men's 10 km freestyle events in cross-country skiing, were held on April 3, 2011, as part of the 2011 IPC Biathlon and Cross-Country Skiing World Championships.

Medals

Results

Sitting

Standing

Visually impaired

References

2011 IPC Biathlon and Cross-Country Skiing World Championships Live results, and schedule at ipclive.siwidata.com
WCH - Khanty Mansiysk - Results - Cross-Country Middle Distance, IPC Nordic Skiing

10 kilometre freestyle